The Pace–King House, also known as the Charles Hill House, is a historic home located in Richmond, Virginia.  It was built in 1860, and is a large two-story, three bay, Italianate style brick dwelling.  It has a shallow hipped roof with a richly detailed bracketed cornice and four exterior end chimneys.  It features a one-story, cast-iron porch, composed of a wide center arch with narrow flanking arches, all supported on slender foliated columns.  Also on the property are a contributing brick, two-story servants' house fronted by a two-level gallery and a brick structure which incorporates the original kitchen and stable outbuildings.

It was listed on the National Register of Historic Places in 1974.

References

External links
National Park Service: Pace–King House

Houses on the National Register of Historic Places in Virginia
Italianate architecture in Virginia
Houses completed in 1860
Houses in Richmond, Virginia
National Register of Historic Places in Richmond, Virginia